Indian chess is the name given to regional variations of chess played in India in the 18th and 19th centuries.  It is distinct from chaturanga. There are several such variations, all quite similar to modern rules, with variants regarding castling, pawn promotion, etc. These variants were popular in India until the 1960s. However, even today a mix of Indian and international rules and terminology are used in some parts of India.

Differences from Western chess 

 The king cannot move unless at least one check has been given.
 When only the kings and pawns are left in play, the opponent may not give check, but they can win by stalemate. Alternatively, giving check is allowed, but the capture of the last pawn (which would result in a draw) is disallowed.
 The pawn's two-step initial move is absent in Indian chess; thus, the en passant capture is also absent.
 Normal castling with rook and king is absent. The king can make a knight's move once in a game, known as Indian castling.
 On reaching the opposite end of the board, a pawn is promoted to a piece of the type that began on that square. If it is promoted on the king's initial position, it is promoted a queen.
 If there is one piece remaining other than the kings, it may not be captured. Alternatively, it may be captured unless it is a pawn.

Names of the pieces
The following table describes one version of Indian chess terminology for the various pieces (including Hindi and Urdu pronunciations):

See also
 Origins of chess
 Chaturaji, four-handed version of chaturanga
 Shatranj

References

Further reading
 Bhartiya Shatranj [in Hindi] by Dwarka Prasad Gupta. Published by Vangmaya Prakashan, Jaipur
The History of Chess: from the Time of the Early Invention of the Game in India till the Period of its establishment in Western and Central Europe - The History of Chess: from the Time of the Early Invention of the Game in India till the Period of its establishment in Western and Central Europe

Games related to chaturanga
Chess in India
18th century in chess
Traditional board games